Ann Arbor station is a train station in Ann Arbor, Michigan, United States that is served daily by Amtrak's (the national railroad passenger system) Wolverine, which runs three times daily between Chicago, Illinois and Pontiac, Michigan, via Detroit.

History
The station replaced the 1877 Michigan Central Railroad-built depot. The present-day station neighbors the Michigan Central depot, which was renovated as the "Gandy Dancer" restaurant, which opened in 1970. The previous station had been sold to the C.A. Muer Corporation (who turned it into the restaurant) in 1969 by the Penn Central Transportation Company, who had owned the station. The railroad believed that it would likely be to soon be ceasing passenger operations outside of the Northeast Corridor, which would have rendered their ownership of the station unnecessary, so, when approached with an offer by the C.A. Muer Corporation to buy it, they accepted. However, two years later, Amtrak was launched, keeping passenger service in Ann Arbor alive.

For more than a decade after the station former station was sold, passengers in Ann Arbor used the railroad's former express office (located just east of the Broadway Bridge) as a station building. However, this proved to be inadequate in size, especially after daily passenger numbers rose from 15 in 1969 to 250 in 1975. By the mid-1970s, talk arose about constructing a new station to accommodate Ann Arbor's passengers. To expand the small waiting room space of the former express office as a station building, Amtrak began work on enclosing space under the canopy between the express office and the original Michigan Central Railroad station, but stopped after Ann Arbor issued a stop-work order due to Chuck Muer (C.A. Muer Corporation head) objected, arguing there was insufficient parking at the site. As a makeshift measure, a surplus portable classroom building was purchased from the Ann Arbor Public Schools, and placed under the Broadway Bridge for use as an overflow waiting room.

On April 17, 1979, the Michigan Department of Transportation (MDOT) sent a letter to Ann Arbor Mayor Louis Belcher about the need for a new station building, writing, "Ann Arbor is the second heaviest Amtrak station (in passenger numbers) in Michigan and deserves adequate station and parking facilities." In mid-1979, interested parties, including MDOT, Ann Arbor's city government, the University of Michigan, Greyhound Lines, and the Michigan Association of Railroad Passengers, formed a committee to study the construction of a new station building, and where to locate it. Pollack Design Associates, an Ann Arbor-based firm, was contracted to conduct a study, including exploring alternative sites at which a new station building might be located. It released its 98-page report on November 15, 1979. Of the numerous sites looked at, 325 Depot Street came out as the preferred site.

Congressman Carl Pursell secured a federal earmark to fund the construction of a new station building.

The current station building was constructed in 1983. Additionally, a 100-space parking lot was constructed on the opposite side of the railroad tracks (with a stairway being installed to allow people to travel over the tracks). The station building was built in a standard design.

Description 

The station is located at 325 Depot Street. (Broadway Street is nearby, but as Broadway is elevated over both Depot Street and the train tracks, there is no direct access to Depot Street from Broadway Street.)

As per 2019 estimates, a population of 1,429,901 people lives within  of the station, and a population of 5,556,996 lives within  of the station.

The station has a ticket office, is fully wheelchair accessible and has an enclosed waiting area. Other amenities include public restrooms, vending machines, paid parking, and a taxi stand. Baggage cannot be checked at this location; however, up to two suitcases in addition to any "personal items" such as briefcases, purses, laptop bags, and infant equipment are allowed on board as carry-ons.

The station's waiting room has roughly 60 seats, which is less than its typical boarding loads (which were 80 to 120 passengers circa 2017).

The station has 38 metered short-term parking spaces, and 80 free long-term parking spots.

In regards to passenger numbers, Ann Arbor has been the busiest station along the Wolverine's route, with the exception of Chicago Union Station, and busiest Amtrak station in the state of Michigan.

Notable nearby locations include the University of Michigan and the Great Lakes Environmental Research Laboratory.

Rail services
Currently, the only train route serving the station is the Wolverine.

In the past, the station was served by the Michigan Executive and the Lake Cities.

Ann Arbor is a planned stop on the proposed Ann Arbor–Detroit Regional Rail system. Ann Arbor is also included as a stop on one possible alignment considered by MDOT for a potential "Coast-to-Coast" rail service, connecting the state's two largest cities (Detroit and Grand Rapids) with its capital city (Lansing).

Amtrak ridership
After only Chicago Union Station, Ann Arbor is the busiest station on the Wolverine, as well as the busiest of the 22 Amtrak stations in Michigan.

In 2019, Amtrak handled 156,674 train arrivals and departures at the station. All of these were coach and business class tickets (the Wolverine does not have a first class or sleeper class). A vast majority of trips were to/from Chicago Union Station. Additionally, there were 2,057 passenger arrivals/departures tp the single city which Amtrak Thruway bus service connects the station with. 

In 2019, the average Amtrak fare to/from the station cost $47.00, and the average yield per mile (revenue generated per passenger mile) on trips to/from the station was $0.218. 

In 2019, the top city pair on the Wolverine, both by ridership and by revenue, was Ann Arbor–Chicago. Ann Arbor–Kalamazoo ranked tenth among city pairs in terms of Wolverine revenue. The top city pair involving any of Michigan's 22 stations, both in terms of ridership and revenue, is Ann Arbor–Chicago. In 2019, of the 265 city pairs served at Chicago Union Station, Ann Arbor–Chicago ranked sixth-highest in both ridership and revenue.

Annual Amtrak passenger traffic

Top station pairs by Amtrak ridership
The following is the top-ten stations which receive the most ridership to/from ARTIC out of the (as of 2019) fifteen stations that the Wolverine connects the Ann Arbor Station to/from.

Top station pairs by Amtrak revenue
The following is the top-ten stations which generate the most revenue from trips to/from the (as of 2019) fifteen stations that the Wolverine connects the Ann Arbor Station to/from.

Proposed replacement station 
Officials in Ann Arbor have expressed a belief that the existing station does not adequately accommodate the ridership in Ann Arbor, which has increased since the station was built. By the 2000s, Ann Arbor's city government was discussing replacing the current station with a larger station.

In addition to concerns about existing inadequacies of the current station, discussion about building a new station also arose in anticipation of increased use due to higher-speed service along the Wolverine route, the possible addition of more Amtrak service, as well as possibility of a commuter rail being established between Detroit and Ann Arbor. As of 2014, projections had been made that, by some point between the years 2035 and 2040, if roundtrips of the Wolverine were increased to ten (from the existing three), annual ridership at the station could reach 969,000. Projections had also been made that a future commuter rail service could have 516,000 boardings and deboardings of its own.

Earlier plans for a Fuller Road station
By 2006, the city of Ann Arbor was making plans to construct a new station on Fuller Road by the University of Michigan Hospital, which would also serve planned commuter rail. However, in February 2012, it was determined the Ann Arbor and the University of Michigan would not be partnering to construct a 1,000 car parking structure for such a station, which led to the plan being scrapped. It had been estimated, at the time, that the station would have cost $30 million. Plans were that the city would have paid $3 million of the cost, and most of the cost would be paid for by the federal government.

Restart of planning for a new station
October 15, 2012, the Ann Arbor City Council voted to accept a $2.8 federal rail grant, and to spend $500,000 of the city general fund reserves to make preparations for a potential new station. In October 2013, the Ann Arbor City Council approved a resolution which hired the URS Corporation to lead the an environmental review study for a new station.

One of the sites that was under consideration for a new station was the earlier-planned site along Fuller Road. Another site under consideration was the existing site on Depot Street. The remaining six sites under consideration were the south side of Barton Pond (at the north edge of the Barton Nature Area), an area near Argo Pond and Bandemer Park, a site next to the University of Michigan's Mitchell Field, and two locations in and adjacent to Gallup Park. In June 2014, it was announced that three sites had been chosen for further review: the Fuller Road site, the existing Depot Street site, and the site near Argo Pond.

2014 report
In 2014, the project team looking into the three remaining site options for a new station released a 22-page report, and furthered narrowed the options down to focus on the existing Depot Street site, and the Fuller Road site.

The team eliminated consideration of a station on a portion of track along North Main Street next to Argo Pond. The reasons for ending consideration of the this location was site constraints, such as the requirement for several private properties to be acquire (forcing several businesses to relocate), and concerns about transit connections and roadway access.

The report made proposals for stations at both of the two sites they narrowed down for consideration. Each would see a  station building and adjoining intermodal facility with more than 2,000 parking spaces (the number of initial parking spaces could be lower, with later expansion), four intercity bus berths, five local bus berths, taxi stands, and bicycle parking. Other amenities were also considered for each site. while there was the possibility that the Depot Street site would require the use of land currently owned by DTE Energy. By the time of the report, Amtrak had made it known that the preferred for a new station to be built elevated above the tracks, so that a single waiting room could provide easy access to platforms serving both east and westbound trains.

Environmental assessment report
In September 2017, the city of Ann Arbor released a 212-page environmental assessment report looking at options for a new station. The report was released with clearance from the Federal Railroad Administration, who the city had been in private discussions with for months.

The report settled on the Fuller Road site as its preferred location. The proposal for a station there has its station building constructed above the tracks, and also features a large parking structure.

The report estimated the cost of its plan for a station on Fuller Road would be $81 million. The report had estimated that costs of alternate plans that would to see a new station built at/near the existing location at Depot Street  (costing between $94 million and $98 million) would cost would cost more than a station at Fuller Street, due, in part, to their plan for a new station at this location including the widening of bridges carrying Broadway Street, and the need to acquire 2.5 acres of land from Amtrak and 2.6 acres of land from DTE Energy in order to construct the new station building and a parking structure to serve it.

The report, based on projections of ridership for the year 2035, stated that the station needed to be  in size in order to adhere to Amtrak's station guidelines. The report included a projection that shorter travel times on the Wolverines (as a result of rail improvements), along with increased train frequencies, and improved reliability and connections for the route could lead to the station seeing 969,000 annual passengers by 2035 (if the Wolverine increased frequency to 10 daily roundtrips by then). The report also included a projection that a commuter rail service to Detroit could see between 134,320 and 229,950 annual passengers at the station.

Current plans for station along Fuller Road
With a site selected, more formal plans were designed.

Design
The project has been designed to be constructed in two phases.

Phase one of construction would see the station, and enough parking to handle the demands of the immediate future, constructed. The gross building area of this phase would be . The parking structure would include a bus station, as well as a facility for bicycle maintenance and storage.

Phase two of construction would see a further buildout, if commuter rail were to be constructed. This buildout would see more parking, improvements to the rail system, new platforms, and other improvements. The gross building area of this phase would be .

Estimated costs
Phase one would cost over $88 million, and phase two would cost $83.1 million, making for a cumulative cost of around $171.1 million.

Of the first phase's $88.4 million of expenses, nearly $55 million would go to the construction of a parking structure $20.3 million would go towards the construction of a train station/bridge/platform; $12.28 million would go towards other site and roadway improvements; $156,000 would go towards fiber-optic cable work and upgrades to tracks and upgrades.

Of the second phase's costs, $66.1 million would go towards parking structure construction (including $26.4 million for commuter rail parking), $4.4 million would go towards construction of a commuter rail station/bridge/platform, $3.8 million would go towards other site and roadway enhancements, and $8.7 million would go towards fiber-optic cable work and upgrades to tracks and upgrades.

The current $121 million price tag is a large increase from earlier estimates. In 2012, cost estimates for a station at Fuller Road were $30 million. In 2014, cost estimates for construction of a new station (without a location decided) were $45 million. The cost estimates for construction rose later to $65 million. In 2014, cost estimates for a station at Fuller Road were $81 million. In January 2019, Ann Arbor Mayor Christoper Taylor's annual report gave a new $87 million cost estimate for the construction of the station, which was higher than all previous cost estimates. By 2021, the estimated cost was $121 million, with phase one of the station costing $88 million, and phase two costing $83 million.

Since at least 2013, the city's plans have remained for 80% of the construction costs to be paid for by the federal government, and the remaining 20% to be paid for by local partners. Local partners could include Washtenaw County's government, Ann Arbor Area Transportation Authority, University of Michigan, MDOT, and Greyhound Lines.

FRA withdrawal of further consideration and subsequent developments
In August 2021, the Federal Railroad Administration stopped work on environmental assessment for the station, citing high costs of the designed station, stating that the design, "exceeds intercity passenger rail needs". The FRA also took issue with the "substantial amount of parking" planned, even though the parking had been decided upon due to projected ridership needs and Amtrak guidelines.

In 2022, Ann Arbor officials tried again lobbying for federal support, declaring that it might be possible to reduce the scale of the planned station and accompanying parking and to reconfigure bus accommodations in a manner that would bring down projected costs. This would including decreasing the number of parking spaces, factoring the vehicle use reduction targets in city's new A2Zero carbon-neutrality plan into the number of station parking spaces to be constructed. It has been declared that, if the station were built with an initial parking capacity of only around 250 spaces, this might allow for the existing surface parking lot at the site to be sufficient for the stations' needs, and for no structure to be initially needed. Constructing an outdoor intermodal facility for municipal and intercity buses, instead of an indoor facility, has also received mention as a means to decrease expenses.

The city has also expressed an openness to reexploring the alternative of enhancing the existing station location, despite the city viewing it as a more constrained site and projecting that it would have greater expenses than the Fuller Road location. Advantages given for building at the Fuller Road site include the lack of need for additional right-of-way acquisition, the potential for strong transit connection, the ability for strong bicycle and pedestrian facility connections, superior vehicle access (compared to the Depot Street site), larger site size, and close proximity to significant centers of employment. Advantages given for the existing Depot Street location include superior proximity to Ann Arbor's downtown, slightly stronger public preference (per studies done years prior), and strong connections to bicycle and pedestrian facilities.

There has also been at least some talk about building a bare station, with just a simple platform, at the Fuller Road site in order to provide rail access to the nearby hospital (for commuting hospital workers), and having trains stop at both this new station and the existing Depot Street station.

References

External links

Amtrak Stations Database

Amtrak stations in Michigan
Buildings and structures in Ann Arbor, Michigan
Railway stations in the United States opened in 1983
Transportation in Ann Arbor, Michigan
1983 establishments in Michigan
Michigan Line